David Catching (born June 7, 1961) is an American musician from Memphis, Tennessee. He is a founding member of the California stoner rock band earthlings?, a touring member of Eagles of Death Metal and the co-founder of the Rancho De La Luna recording studio.

Career 

Catching has played the guitar for well-known hard rock bands Eagles of Death Metal, Queens of the Stone Age, Tex and the Horseheads, as well as The Ringling Sisters, earthlings?, Mondo Generator and the Masters of Reality. He is also a member of Yellow #5, and the Gnarltones.

Catching has been associated with the desert country rock band, Smith & Pyle. He contributed to the debut album of country rock duo Smith & Pyle, It's OK to be Happy, which was recorded at Rancho de la Luna and released in 2008. He currently resides in Joshua Tree, California.

Catching was on stage with Eagles of Death Metal during the November 2015 Paris attacks, and escaped the Bataclan with the rest of the band. Catching talked about this at length on the show Conan Neutron's Protonic Reversal, Rolling Stone and other media.

Musical equipment 
With the Eagles of Death Metal, Catching plays his 1967 Gibson Flying V through a tuner and distortion pedal and Supro amplifier with a 2x12 cabinet. In recent shows with EODM, Catching is seen using Orange amplifiers. He also uses an Ampeg Dan Armstrong guitar when playing with Eagles of Death Metal. Catching also uses HipStrap vintage styled guitar straps. He is endorsed by and uses coiled red Bullet Cable. During recordings he also uses some of Jesse Hughes's Matons.

Catching released a signature fuzz wah pedal in 2015, the Roadrunner, through Dr. No Effects.

With the earthlings?, he uses his 1958 Fender Stratocaster or his 1972 double cutaway Gibson Les Paul through a tuner and a distortion Rat pedal. His Les Paul is 1 of 6 ever made by Strings & Things in Memphis, Tennessee. Other guitars were bought by Ace Frehley, Jeff Beck, Pat Travers, and Michael Woods, guitarist for the group America. Photos have circulated of Dave's very guitar nearly being bought by Greg Lake of Emerson, Lake, and Palmer fame, but opting out at the last minute for an acoustic bass.

Partial discography 
 The Modifiers (1980's]
 60 Watt Reality (The Ringling Sisters, 1990)
 The Desert Sessions 1 & 2 (1998)
 Queens of the Stone Age (Queens of the Stone Age, 1998)
"Scraps at Midnight ((Mark Lanegan 1998)
 The Desert Sessions 3 & 4 (1998)
 The Desert Sessions 5 & 6 (1999)
 Rated R (Queens of the Stone Age, 2000)
 Human Beans (earthlings?, 2001)
 Deep in the Hole (Masters of Reality, 2001)
 Songs for the Deaf (Queens of the Stone Age, 2002)
 A Drug Problem That Never Existed (Mondo Generator, 2003)
 The Desert Sessions 9 & 10 (2003)
 Bubblegum (Mark Lanegan Band, 2004)
 III the EP (Mondo Generator, 2004)
Cowboy Coffee and Burnt Knives (Hulk 2004)
 Lullabies to Paralyze (Queens of the Stone Age, 2005)
 I Got a Brand New Egg Layin' Machine (Goon Moon, 2005)
 Death By Sexy... (Eagles of Death Metal, 2006)
 Powder Burns (The Twilight Singers, 2006)
 Dead Planet (Mondo Generator, 2006)
 Licker's Last Leg (Goon Moon, 2007)
 Neptune (The Duke Spirit, 2008)
Prime Motivator (Giraffes 2008)
Heart On (Eagles of Death Metal 2008)
Saturnalia (Gutter Twins 2008)
 Humalien (earthlings?, 2009)
 Pine Cross Dover (Masters of Reality, 2009)
 Blues Funeral (Mark Lanegan Band, 2012)
 Spine Hits (Sleepy Sun, 2012)
 Tomorrowland Blues (Star & Dagger, 2013)
Do to the Beast (Afghan Whigs 2014)
 Unfuckwithable (Mojave Lords, 2014)
ecaps (earthlings? 2014)
Wild Nights (Pins 2015)
 Your Desert My Mind (The Mutants, 2016)
Mudda Fudda (earthlings? 2016)
 The Golden West (album) (Gayle Skidmore, 2017)
Shared Hallucinations Pt.1 (David Catching and Friends 2017)

References 

1961 births
Living people
American rock guitarists
American male guitarists
Musicians from Memphis, Tennessee
Queens of the Stone Age members
Survivors of terrorist attacks
November 2015 Paris attacks
Guitarists from Tennessee
20th-century American guitarists
Mondo Generator members
Eagles of Death Metal members
Earthlings? members
Masters of Reality members